The Contender Challenge: UK vs. USA is a series of boxing matches on 30 March 2007, held at Metro Radio Arena, Newcastle, England. Six boxers from the US reality television shows The Contender and The Contender 2, in a team coached by Sugar Ray Leonard, took on six boxers from the UK, all promoted by Frank Warren, and coached by Barry McGuigan. The winning team was awarded the "Sugar Ray Leonard Cup", not unlike the Ryder Cup in Golf

The bouts was the basis of a TV series broadcast in the US by ESPN and in the UK by ITV4, with six episodes, beginning on 10 April 2007, with commentary by the well-known ESPN team of Joe Tessitore and Teddy Atlas, with the British boxing commentator John Rawling joining. Leonard and McGuigan provided some analysis through the fight as well.

Format
Points were awarded to each team as follows:

In the event of a tie, the total number of knockouts by each team would have determined the winner.

The bouts were scored in the American style, with three ringside judges and a non-scoring referee. British non-title bouts are scored solely by the referee.

The referees and judges were of both nationalities.

Matchups
The matchups, all scheduled for eight rounds with weights ranging from welterweight to light heavyweight, were:

Results
The matchup finished as a 4–2 US victory, with Curiel, Bundrage, Gomez and Ravelo winning for the US, and Small and Reid winning for the UK.  

Two other fights were not included in the official scoring on the card, Paul Smith(UK) vs Jonathan Reid(USA) and Nigel Wright(UK) vs Jonathan Nelson(USA). Smith beat Reid by a controversial stoppage in the 7th round, as Smith was winning the fight and seemed to have Reid hurt from a body shot earlier, but clearly pushed Reid to the canvas in the 7th round. The referee ruled the push correctly, but judged that Reid could not continue after he got up when Reid seemingly could still defend himself. Wright also stopped the outmatched Nelson, who was a late substitute, in the 2nd round of their fight on cuts. Neither of these matches counted towards the scoring of the challenge because ITV4 had issues with airtime, so only six fights of the Challenge could be shown on TV.

Controversy
The tourney got off to a late start, which ITV representatives said was due to ESPN micromanaging the matchups to guarantee a US victory, explaining how non-Contender fighter Jerson Ravelo fought in a bout for the cup. The last three bouts were heckled by the crowd, with the last fight beginning at 2 am, and members of Team US jeering along with the ticketholders. Additionally, one apparently drunken fan verbally threatened the cornermen for Team US just before the main event, drawing the ire of the entire Minter family, who were apparently seated nearby. When the fan threw a keychain at the US corner, security ejected him, drawing cheers from the crowd.

References

2007 American television seasons
2007 British television seasons
2000s American reality television series
2007 American television series debuts
2007 American television series endings
2000s British sports television series
2007 British television series debuts
2007 British television series endings
UK vs. USA
ESPN original programming
ITV (TV network) original programming